Year 449 (CDXLIX) was a common year starting on Saturday (link will display the full calendar) of the Julian calendar. At the time, it was known as the Year of the Consulship of Astyrius and Romanus (or, less frequently, year 1202 Ab urbe condita). The denomination 449 for this year has been used since the early medieval period, when the Anno Domini calendar era became the prevalent method in Europe for naming years.

Events 
 By place 

 Europe 
 Emperor Valentinian III sends an embassy to Attila the Hun. The purpose of the meeting is a long-running dispute over spoils of war during the Danube offensive (441–442). Attila claims his lost property, but Valentinian and Flavius Aetius (magister militum) refuse this request. 
 Flavius Orestes, Roman aristocrat, is sent to Attila's court and becomes a high-ranking secretary (notarius). He is the father of the future emperor Romulus Augustulus.  
 Traditional date – Vortigern, supposed king of the Britons, invites Hengist and Horsa, by tradition chieftains of the Jutes, to form a military alliance against the Picts and Scoti, so contributing to the Anglo-Saxon settlement of Britain (according to Bede).

 By topic 

 Religion 
 August 3 – The Second Council of Ephesus opens, chaired by Dioscorus, patriarch of Alexandria. Flavian, patriarch of Constantinople, and Domnus II, patriarch of Antioch, are deposed on August 8.
 October – A Roman synod repudiates all the decisions of the Second Council of Ephesus.
 Anatolius becomes patriarch of Constantinople.
 Maximus II becomes patriarch of Antioch.

Births 
 February 25 – Liu Ziye, emperor of the Liu Song dynasty (d. 466)
 Eugendus, abbot of Condat Abbey (approximate date)
 Kavadh I, king of the Persian Empire (d. 531)

Deaths 
 August 11 – Flavian, patriarch of Constantinople
 Eucherius, bishop of Lyon (approximate date)
 Hilary, bishop of Arles (b. 403)

References